List of novels for adults, which were written in Faroese. The written form of the Faroese language is rather recent. The spelling rules, as devised by V.U. Hammershaimb, have been in use since the mid 19th century, but no novels were written in Faroese until the early 20th century. The well-known Faroese writers William Heinesen and Jørgen-Frantz Jacobsen wrote their novels in Danish, and therefore their novels are not on this list. They are considered, however, to be an important part of the Faroese literature, leaving linguistic considerations aside. Below is a list of Faroese novels which were written in Faroese and were published over a period of 100 years from 1909 to 2012. ("" is the Faroese word for novel.)

 1909 -  / Regin í Líð. - Tórshavn :  – 262 pages
 1927 -  / Victor Danielsen. - Tórshavn : V. Danielsen – 62 pages
 1927 -  / H. A. Djurhuus. - Tórshavn : [s.n.] – 157 pages
 1930 -  / Heðin Brú. - Tórshavn :  – 151 pages
 1935 -  / Heðin Brú. - Tórshavn :  – 205 pages
 1940 -  / Heðin Brú. - Tórshavn :  – 159 pages
 1946 -  / Martin Joensen. - Tórshavn :  – 322 pages
 1947 -  / Victor Danielsen. - Tórshavn :  – 102 pages
 1952 -  / H.M. Eidesgaard. - Tórshavn :  – 152 pages
 1952 -  / Martin Joensen. - Tórshavn :  – 344 pages
 1958 -  / Jens Pauli Heinesen. - Tórshavn : J.P. Heinesen – 210 pages
 1962 -  / Jens Pauli Heinesen. - Tórshavn : J.P. Heinesen, 1962–1966, 3 volumes – 409 pages
 1963 -  / Heðin Brú. - Tórshavn : H. Brú – 195 pages
 1968 -  / Hans J. Ellingsgaard. - Tórshavn :  – 85 pages
 1970 -  / Heðin Brú. - Tórshavn :  – 321 pages
 1971 -  / Dagmar Joensen-Næs. - Tórshavn : D. Joensen-Næs – 114 pages
 1972 -  / Heðin Brú. - Tórshavn : Emil Thomsen – 251 pages
 1973 -  / Jens Pauli Heinesen. - Tórshavn : J.P. Heinesen – 466 pages
 1977 -  / Jens Pauli Heinesen. - Tórshavn :  – 117 pages
 1977 -  / Magnus Dam Jacobsen. - Bagsværd : M.D. Jacobsen – 164 pages
 1978 -  / Valdemar Poulsen. - Tórshavn : Bókagarður, Emil Thomsen – 269 pages
 1978 -  / Louis Zachariasen. - Tórshavn : Bókagarður, Emil Thomsen – 169 pages
 1979 -  / Jens Pauli Heinesen. - Tórshavn :  – 133 pages
 1979 -  / Carl Johan Jensen. - Tórshavn : C.J. Jensen – 59 pages
 1980 -  / Jens Pauli Heinesen. - Tórshavn :  – 162 pages
 1981 -  / Jens Pauli Heinesen. - Tórshavn :  – 126 pages
 1982 -  / Jens Pauli Heinesen. - Tórshavn :  – 167 pages
 1982 -  / Oddvør Johansen. - Tórshavn :  – 175 pages
 1983 -  / Jens Pauli Heinesen. - Tórshavn :  – 192 pages
 1984 -  / Marianna Debes Dahl. - Tórshavn :  – 160 pages
 1984 -  / Jens Pauli Heinesen. - Tórshavn :  – 131 pages
 1984 -  / Steinbjørn B. Jacobsen. - Tórshavn : S. Jacobsen – 134 pages
 1986 -  / Marianna Debes Dahl. - Tórshavn : Fannir – 130 pages
 1987 -  / Høgni av Heiði. - Copenhagen :  – 136 pages
 1987 -  / Einar Petersen. - Sørvágur : Scorpio – 93 pages
 1988 -  / Marianna Debes Dahl. - Tórshavn :  – 196 pages
 1988 -  / Óli Dahl. - Tórshavn :  – 119 pages
 1988 -  / Jens Pauli Heinesen. - Tórshavn :  – 167 pages
 1988 -  / Magnus Dam Jacobsen. - Tórshavn :  – 141 pages
 1990 -  / D. P. Danielsen. - Tórshavn :  – 246 pages
 1990 -  / Bergtóra Hanusardóttir. - Copenhagen :  – 147 pages
 1990 -  / Jógvan Isaksen. - Copenhagen :  – 263 pages
 1990 -  / Martin Næs. - Tórshavn :  – 106 pages
 1990 -  / Kristian Osvald Viderø. - Tórshavn : Bókagarður, Emil Thomsen – 252 pages
 1991 -  / Gunnar Hoydal. - Kollafjørður :  – 265 pages
 1991 -  / Steinbjørn B. Jacobsen. - Tórshavn : S. Jacobsen – 116 pages
 1991 -  / Jóanes Nielsen. - Copenhagen :  – 126 pages
 1992 -  / Marianna Debes Dahl. - Tórshavn :  – 150 pages
 1992 -  / Jens Pauli Heinesen. - Tórshavn :  – 246 pages
 1993 -  / Oddvør Johansen. - Copenhagen :  – 170 pages
 1994 -  / Høgni av Heiði. - Copenhagen :  – 127 pages
 1994 -  / Tóroddur Poulsen. - Tórshavn :  – 132 pages
 1994 -  / Jógvan Isaksen. - Copenhagen :  – 243 pages
 1995 -  / Ólavur í Beiti. - Sørvágur :  – 247 pages
 1995 -  / Carl Jóhan Jensen. - Copenhagen :  – 283 pages
 1995 -  / Ólavur í Beiti. - Sørvágur :  – 208 pages
 1996 -  / Jógvan Isaksen. - Nivå :  – 86 pages - 
 1996 -  / Mina Reinert. - Copenhagen :  – 223 pages
 1997 -  / Tóroddur Poulsen. - Tórshavn :  – 144 pages,  
 1997 -  / Sonni Jacobsen. - Sørvágur :  – 185 pages, 
 1997 -  / Jóanes Nielsen. - Copenhagen :  – 176 pages, 
 1998 -  / Sonni Jacobsen. - Sørvágur :  – 245 pages, 
 1998 -  / Oddvør Johansen. - Copenhagen :  – 224 pages, 
 1999 -  / Oluf Djurhuus. - Innan Glyvur : O. Djurhuus – 122 pages, 
 1999 -  / Bergtóra Hanusardóttir. - Copenhagen :  – 184 pages, 
 1999 -  / Jens Pauli Heinesen. - Copenhagen :  – 297 pages, 
 1999 -  / Gunnar Hoydal. - Tórshavn :  – 309 pages
 1999 -  / Sonni Jacobsen. - Sørvágur :  – 191 pages, 
 1999 -  / Oluf Djurhuus. - Innan Glyvur : O. Djurhuus – 155 pages, 
 2000 -  / Jens Pauli Heinesen. - Copenhagen :  – 120 pages, 
 2000 -  / Annfinnur í Skála. - Tórshavn :  – 264 pages, Series: Heimurin forni 1, 
 2000 -  / Annfinnur í Skála. - Tórshavn :  – 267 pages. Series: , 
 2001 -  / Oddvør Johansen. - Copenhagen :  – 116 pages, 
 2001 -  / Oluf Djurhuus. - Innan Glyvur : O. Djurhuus – 137 pages, 
 2002 -  / Andras Miðskarð. - Klaksvík : A. Miðskarð – 215 pages, 
 2003 -  / Sonni Jacobsen. - Sørvágur :  – 188 pages, 
 2004 -  / Absalon Absalonsen. - Tórshavn :  – 229 pages, 
2004 -  / Jens Pauli Heinesen. - Copenhagen :  – 178 pages,  (print errors in book: 99918-46-52-3)
 2004 -  / Oddvør Johansen. - Copenhagen :  – 128 pages, 
 2004 -  / Jóannes Kjølbro. - [S.l.] : J. Kjølbro – 175 pages, 
 2004 -  / Kári Petersen. - Tórshavn : K. Petersen – 198 pages, 
 2005 -  / Absalon Absalonsen ; perma og myndir: Absalon Absalonsen. - Tórshavn : Løkur lítli – 244 pages, 
 2005 -  / Elias Askham. - Copenhagen :  – 356 pages, 
 2005 -  / Vida Akselsdóttir Højgaard. - Copenhagen :  – 180 pages, 
 2005 -  / Jógvan Isaksen. - Copenhagen :  – 289 pages, 
 2005 -  / Carl Jóhan Jensen. -  Vestmanna : Sprotin – 786 pages, 
 2005 -  / Dagny Joensen. - Copenhagen :  – 174 pages
 2005 -  / Jóanes Nielsen. - Copenhagen :  – 276 pages, 
 2006 -  / Bergtóra Hanusardóttir. - Copenhagen :  – 418 pages, 
 2006 -  / Gunnar Hoydal. - Vestmanna : Sprotin – 517 pages, 
 2007 -  / Jógvan Isaksen. - Copenhagen :  – 253 pages, 
 2007 -  / Sólrún Michelsen. - Copenhagen :  – 118 pages, 
 2008 -  / Tóroddur Poulsen. - Copenhagen :  – 185 pages, 
 2008 -  / Jógvan Isaksen. - Copenhagen :  – 316 pages, 
 2009 -  / Jógvan Isaksen. - Copenhagen :  – 290 pages
 2010 -  / David Johannesen. - Miðvágur : Vón - 135 pages
 2010 -  / Jógvan Isaksen. - Copenhagen :  – 268 pages, 
 2011 -  / Jógvan Isaksen. - Copenhagen :  – 372 pages, 
 2011 -  / Jóanes Nielsen. - Copenhagen :  – 364 pages, 
 2011 -  / Hanus Samró. - Tórshavn : H. Samró – 172 pages, 
 2011 -  / Annfinnur í Skála. - Vestmanna : Sprotin – 310 pages, 
 2012 -  / Jógvan Isaksen. - Copenhagen : Amaldus [i.e.  – 287 pages, 
 2012 -  / Annfinnur í Skála. - Vestmanna :  – 553 pages, 
 2013 -  / Sólrún Michelsen. - Copenhagen :  – 144 pages,

References 

Faroese literature
Faroe Islands-related lists
Works by Faroese people